William Patrick Baude is an American legal scholar. He currently serves as a professor of law at the University of Chicago Law School and is the director of its Constitutional Law Institute. He is a leading scholar of constitutional law and originalism.

Early life and education

Baude attended the University of Chicago, where he was a member of Sigma Xi. He graduated in 2004 with a Bachelor of Science with honors in mathematics with a specialization in economics. He then attended Yale Law School, where he served as an articles and essay editor on the Yale Law Journal. He graduated in 2007 with a Juris Doctor.

Legal career 
After graduating from law school, Baude was a law clerk to Judge Michael W. McConnell of the U.S. Court of Appeals for the Tenth Circuit from 2007 to 2008, then for Chief Justice John G. Roberts of the U.S. Supreme Court from 2008 to 2009. 

From 2009 and 2011, Laude worked as an associate at Robbins, Russell, Englert, Orseck, Untereiner & Sauber LLP in Washington, D.C. In 2012 and 2013, he was a summer fellow at the Center for the Study of Constitutional Originalism at the University of San Diego Law School and a fellow at the Constitutional Law Center at Stanford Law School, where he later worked as a visiting assistant professor of law.

Baude joined the faculty at the University of Chicago Law School in 2014 and was appointed as a tenured professor in 2018. He teaches constitutional law, federal courts, and conflicts of law. In 2020, he established the law school's Constitutional Law Institute, on which he serves as faculty director. He is a co-editor of The Constitution of the United States (4th ed., 2021). and has written extensively on originalism in the U.S. Constitution. Baude is among the most cited active scholars of constitutional law in the United States and the youngest professor on that list.

Baude writes for the Volokh Conspiracy blog and has contributed to the New York Times and the Chicago Tribune. He is an elected member of the American Law Institute.  He is the 2017 recipient of the Federalist Society's Paul M. Bator award. He also co-hosts a podcast, Divided Argument, with law professor Daniel Epps on which they discuss recent Supreme Court decisions. Baude coined the term shadow docket in 2015.

In 2021, Baude, together with fellow faculty members David A. Strauss and Alison LaCroix, was appointed by U.S. President Joe Biden to the Presidential Commission on the Supreme Court of the United States.

See also 
 List of law clerks of the Supreme Court of the United States (Chief Justice)

References

21st-century American lawyers
American legal scholars
American legal writers
Federalist Society members
Illinois lawyers
Law clerks of the Supreme Court of the United States
Living people
American scholars of constitutional law
University of Chicago alumni
University of Chicago Law School faculty
Yale Law School alumni
Year of birth missing (living people)